Comet 96P/Machholz or 96P/Machholz 1 is a short-period sungrazing comet discovered on May 12, 1986, by amateur astronomer Donald Machholz on Loma Prieta peak, in central California using  binoculars. On June 6, 1986, 96P/Machholz passed  from the Earth. 96P/Machholz last came to perihelion on January 31, 2023.

96P/Machholz is unusual among comets in several respects. Other than small SOHO comets, its highly eccentric 5.29 year orbit has the smallest perihelion distance known among numbered/regular short-period comets, bringing it considerably closer to the Sun than the orbit of Mercury. It is also the only known short-period comet with both high orbital inclination and high eccentricity. In 2007, 96P/Machholz was found to be both carbon-depleted and cyanogen-depleted, a chemical composition nearly unique among comets with known compositions. The chemical composition implies a different and possible extrasolar origin.

Orbit 
The orbit of 96P/Machholz corresponds to the Arietids and the Marsden and Kracht comet groups. Its Tisserand parameter with respect to Jupiter, TJ, is 1.94 and comets are generally classified as Jupiter family if TJ > 2. Orbital integrations indicate that TJ was greater than 2 about 2500 years ago. 96P/Machholz is currently in a 9:4 orbital resonance with Jupiter. It may eventually be ejected from the Solar System.

It comes closer to the Sun than any numbered comet less than 321P/SOHO.

Observations 
Machholz 1 entered the field of view of the orbiting Solar and Heliospheric Observatory (SOHO) in 1996, 2002, 2007, 2012, and 2017, where it was seen by the corona-observing LASCO instrument in its C2 and C3 coronagraphs.

2001/02 perihelion 

During the 2001/2002 passage the comet brightened to magnitude −2, and was very impressive as seen by SOHO.

2007 perihelion 

In 2007, it appeared in SOHO's LASCO C3's field of view from April 2 to 6, peaking in brightness on April 4, 2007, around magnitude +2. In these observations, its coma was substantially smaller than the Sun in volume, but the forward scattering of light made the comet appear significantly brighter. 

The comet  SOHO 2333 is believed to be a fragment of Machholz that came off during the 2007 perihelion. It was discovered by Indian amateur astronomer Prafull Sharma in August 2012 by analyzing data from the Solar and Heliospheric Observatory, specifically the Large Angle and Spectrometric Coronagraph. Data analysis of this sort has become commonplace based on public availability of SOHO images. Sharma became the third Indian to have discovered a comet in this manner.

2012 perihelion 

Between July 12–17, 2012, 96P/Machholz was visible in the SOHO LASCO/C3 field of view and expected to brighten to about magnitude +2. Two small faint fragments of 96P/Machholz were detected in the SOHO C2 images. The fragments were five hours ahead of 96P/Machholz, and probably fragmented from the comet during the 2007 perihelion passage.

2017 perihelion 

The 2017 perihelion was on October 27, 2017. At closest approach, it passed  from the Sun. Coronagraphs on SOHO were monitoring the flyby for a fifth time. Its peak brightness was expected to be about 2.0, when it was closest to the Sun.

2023 perihelion 

The January 31, 2023 perihelion passage was the sixth passage observed by SOHO. On February 4, 2023, the comet was recovered in the morning sky 2 degrees above the horizon at around magnitude 7.

Using observations through October 2022, which is three months before the 2023 perihelion passage, the comet will next come to perihelion around May 12, 2028.

Unusual composition 
Spectrographic analysis of the coma of 96P/Machholz was made during its 2007 apparition, as part of the Lowell Observatory comet composition long-term observing program. When compared with the measured abundances of five molecular species in the comae of the other 150 comets in their database, these measurements showed 96P/Machholz to have far fewer carbon molecules. These other comets had on average 72 times as much cyanogen as 96P/Machholz.

There are currently three hypotheses to explain the chemical composition of 96P/Machholz. One hypothesis for the difference is that 96P/Machholz was an interstellar comet from outside the Solar System and was captured by the Sun. Other possibilities are that it formed in an extremely cold region of the Solar System (such that most carbon gets trapped in other molecules). Given how close it approaches the Sun at perihelion, repeated baking by the Sun may have stripped most of its cyanogen.

References

External links 

 Orbit and Observations for 96P/Machholz at the Minor Planet Center
 Fourth sighting of 96P/Machholz by SOHO (July 13, 2012)
 "Family ties: Meet the Machholz's", Sungrazer Project (July 13, 2012)
 

Periodic comets
Sungrazing comets
0096
096P
Meteor shower progenitors
Comets in 2007
Comets in 2012
Comets in 2017
19860512